Claudine Margaret Castelo Barretto (born July 20, 1979) is a Filipino actress, singer, and entrepreneur.

Popularly dubbed as “The Optimum Star” by various media outlets, Barretto has won 3 FAMAS Award including 2 Best Actress wins and a German Moreno Youth Achievement Award. She is arguably the “Queen of Teleserye,” a title she shares with showbiz rival Judy Ann Santos. She is also recognized as one of the actresses that helped define pop culture of the 90s, dominating movies, TVs, ads, and every place imaginable. Yes! Magazine ranked Barretto as the 6th Star Who Ruled the Decade (2000-2009). In 2008, she was inducted at Eastwood City Walk of Fame. 

Barretto first appeared in ABS-CBN's youth-oriented variety show, Ang TV. She then was cast in sitcom Home Along Da Riles that same year in which the film adaptation of the TV show became her official film debut in 1993. She landed her first television drama lead role in 1997's Mula sa Puso which ran for two years and established her as a household name in Philippine entertainment.

In the Primetime Television richness she has done 11 Primetime projects such as Mula Sa Puso (1997-1999), Saan Ka Man Naroroon (1999-2001), Sa Dulo Ng Walang Hanggan (2001-2003), Marina (2004), Ikaw Ang Lahat Sa Akin (2005), Walang Kapalit (2007), and both Maligno and Iisa Pa Lamang respectively in 2008 before her departure from her mother station in 2009, leading to several planned projects such as Magkaribal (2010), which was set to be her next project, to be offered to Bea Alonzo as a replacement for the role of Angela Agustin.

Career

Early work ABS-CBN (1992–1996)
Barretto was discovered by talent manager Douglas Quijano in 1992 through older sister, Gretchen Barretto, also an actress. That same year, she landed her first major role on television when she was cast for ABS-CBN's youth-oriented variety show, Ang TV.

In 1993, she starred at television series Home Along Da Riles with Dolphy which further introduced her to local media. She also appeared in television shows like Oki Doki Doc (1993–2000), Palibhasa Lalake (1993–1998) and movie May Minamahal (1993).

In 1993 she starred in Pare Ko with Mark Anthony Fernandez and in Oki Doki Doc: The Movie. 

In 1996, she starred in various films with Star Cinema which includes, Radio Romance, her first film with Rico Yan, Mangarap Ka, her first major film role with Mark Anthony Fernandez, and Madrasta with Christopher de Leon and Sharon Cuneta.

Breakthrough (1997–2001)
Barretto landed her first ever television drama series in 1997 titled Mula sa Puso. The series ran for three consecutive years on ABS-CBN. That same year she starred in films like Home Along Da Riles 2 with Dolphy, Calvento Files: The Movie with Rio Locsin and Diether Ocampo, and F.L.A.M.E.S.The Movie with Rico Yan, Paula Peralejo, and Boots Anson-Roa.

In 1998, she portrayed Mela in the film Dahil Mahal na Mahal Kita which was directed by Wenn V. Deramas, alongside Rico Yan and Diether Ocampo.

Then came 1999's Saan Ka Man Naroroon where she portrayed as triplets in the name of Rosario, Rosenda and Rosemarie which earned her a nomination for Best Actress in the Asian TV Awards. Also the same year she starred in films like Soltera with Diether Ocampo and Maricel Soriano, and the film adaptation of Mula sa Puso.

She also co-starred Vilma Santos in the highly commended 2000 movie Anak directed by Rory Quintos.

In 2001, she was cast as the lead role in the drama series Sa Dulo ng Walang Hanggan (2001–2003) with Carlos Agassi, Luis Alandy, and Mylene Dizon and  film Oops! Teka Lang... Diskarte Ko 'To with Robin Padilla.

Critical and commercial success (2002–2008)
In 2002, she starred in a romantic-comedy film by Olivia Lamasan titled Got 2 Believe with real-life partner Rico Yan. The film received critical and box office success some noting it as one of the best romcom movies of all time and has inspired countless films that followed it. On the same year, she did the movie Kailangan Kita with Aga Muhlach. The film was directed by Rory Quintos in where Barretto's acting was once again acclaimed by critics and many has cited it as one of her best works.

In 2003, she was joined by Diether Ocampo, Onemig Bondoc, Assunta De Rossi, and Piolo Pascual in the Wenn V. Deramas' series Buttercup (2003–2004).

In 2004, she portrayed a mermaid in the breakthrough fantasy television series Marina with Rafael Rosell  
Meryll Soriano, Agot Isidro, Snooky Serna, Malou de Guzman and Cherie Gil. Also on the same year, she starred in the movie Milan opposite Piolo Pascual which was directed by Olivia Lamasan. The film received widespread critical acclaim for its original story and cinematography and has been noted as one of the best romance movies of Philippine Cinema. Her performance of the film also won her a FAMAS Award for Best Actress.

In 2005, she co-starred Jericho Rosales and Diether Ocampo with Gloria Diaz and Hilda Koronel in the film Nasaan Ka Man. The film won her another FAMAS Award for Best Actress and has also been cited as one of her best works. That same year she starred in the film Dubai, directed by Rory Quintos, with co-stars Aga Muhlach and John Lloyd Cruz. She was also part of the ensemble cast of television drama series Ikaw ang Lahat sa Akin alongside Diether Ocampo, Angelika dela Cruz, Shaina Magdayao, Bea Alonzo and John Lloyd Cruz.

In 2006, she starred in the Chito S. Roño's horror film Sukob with Kris Aquino. The movie was the highest-grossing film of that year.

In 2007, she was paired with Piolo Pascual in the television drama series Walang Kapalit which was directed by Wenn V. Deramas.

In 2008, she was cast in Sineserye Presents: Maligno, a fantasy television anthology co-starring Kim Chiu, Rafael Rosell and Diether Ocampo. Also that same year, she landed a remarkable role in the television drama series Iisa Pa Lamang together with Angelica Panganiban, Diether Ocampo, Gabby Concepcion, Cherry Pie Picache, and Susan Roces. The series became 2008's hottest television primetime drama and is regarded as one of Claudine's best televisions series.

Move to GMA Network (2009–2012)
Barretto shocked the local media in November 2009 when she broke ties with her long-time network ABS-CBN and transferred to rival company GMA Network.

In 2010, she started her own weekly drama anthology, Claudine with GMA Network. Also that same year she was a part of a movie produced by GMA Films and Viva Films titled In Your Eyes co-starring Anne Curtis and Richard Gutierrez.

In 2011, she played lead in the television drama Iglot co-starring Jolina Magdangal and Marvin Agustin.

Comeback, TV5 (2015–2017)
Barretto made a major big screen comeback in 2015 starring in the Star Cinema movie Etiquette for Mistresses alongside Kim Chiu, Iza Calzado, Cheena Crab, Kris Aquino and directed by Chito S. Roño. Despite the controversy of the film, it was acclaimed critically and was a box-office hit. Claudine also marks her first appearance on Maalaala Mo Kaya after more than 20 years, in an episode titled  "Itak/Bolo" which aired in October of the same year.

In 2016, she joined TV5 Network and starred in the television drama series Bakit Manipis ang Ulap? which was directed by Joel Lamangan and co-starring Diether Ocampo, Meg Imperial, and Cesar Montano. That same year she appeared in another MMK episode titled "Luneta Park" which aired in December.

In 2017, she made her first ever appearance at the  Star Magic Ball, since she left ABS-CBN in 2009.

In 2020, she signed a management contract with ALV Talent Circuit.

In 2022, she made a comeback acting on GMA Network through leading appearance at Wish Ko Lang. She lead two episode of the said show which both won in television ratings.

Personal life

Claudine Margaret Castelo Barretto was born on July 20, 1979, in Manila, Philippines. She is the youngest of seven children born to Miguel and Estrella "Inday" Barretto. Claudine has two sisters who are also actresses: Gretchen Barretto and Marjorie Barretto.

In March 2002, a month after the box-office success of their movie Got 2 Believe, Barretto lost her on-screen and real-life partner of four years, Rico Yan. The actor died of acute hemorrhagic pancreatitis and his death was considered one of the most shocking in Philippine showbiz.

Barretto married actor Raymart Santiago on March 27, 2006, but was annulled in 2013. They had two children, Sabina and Santino Santiago. In 2015, she adopted a child and named her Quia Barretto.

In 2013, Claudine and sisters Marjorie and Gretchen were involved in a highly publicized feud between them and their family. In February 2019, Claudine reconciled with Gretchen.

On October 7, 2021, Claudine formalized her bid to run as a city councilor for Olongapo City in the 2022 elections under the PDP–Laban political party. On April 12, 2022, Claudine expressed her support for presidential candidate Bongbong Marcos in the elections.

Filmography

Film

Television

Awards and nominations
As a film actress, Barretto has received two FAMAS Award for Best Actress for movies Milan (2004) and Nasaan Ka Man (2005) and a Luna Award for Best Actress for the same movie, Milan. In 2016, she won Dangal ng PASADO sa Pangkatang Pagganap ng may Mataas na Papuri in the 18th Gawad PASADO Awards for her film Etiquette for Mistresses (2015).

On television, she bagged the Best Young Actress award from Parangal ng Bayan in 1999 for Mula Sa Puso and was nominated as Best Drama Actress by the Asian TV Awards in 2000 for Saan Ka Man Naroroon.

Film

Television

Special awards and recognitions

Barretto was awarded Box Office Queen by Guillermo Mendoza Memorial Scholarship Foundation in 2003 and 2006 for the commercial success of her movies, Got 2 Believe and Sukob.

Hailed as one  of the Top 20 stars who ruled the decade (2000–2009) by YES! Magazine, she ranked 6th along with other notable personalities like Kris Aquino, Judy Ann Santos, Vic Sotto and Sharon Cuneta.

In 2009, she was recognised as one of Cinema One's 15 Legends, together with 14 other iconic film stars of the Philippines who helped define Philippine Cinema which includes Fernando Poe Jr., Dolphy, Nora Aunor, Susan Roces, Nida Blanca, Christopher de Leon, Vilma Santos, Maricel Soriano, Aga Muhlach, Robin Padilla, Judy Ann Santos, John Lloyd Cruz, Sharon Cuneta, and Piolo Pascual.

Box Office

Soundtrack

Special awards

Recognitions

References

External links
 

1979 births
Claudine
Filipino child actresses
Living people
People from Manila
Actresses from Manila
Filipino film actresses
Filipino women comedians
People from Iloilo
Visayan people
20th-century Filipino actresses
21st-century Filipino actresses
ABS-CBN personalities
GMA Network personalities
TV5 (Philippine TV network) personalities
Viva Artists Agency